Ernest I of Schauenburg (ca. 1441 – 1471) became the Bishop of Hildesheim in 1458.

The son of Otto of Holstein-Schauenburg became a canon in Hildesheim in 1445. In 1458 (at the age of seventeen) he was chosen as the bishop and installed in the following year. He was devoted to hunting and warfare. In 1459 he introduced restrictions to the church's jurisdiction.

He was unable, however, to fend off the devastation of his bishopric by the neighbouring princes. During his time in office, the Seven Chapters (Sieben Stifter) emerged for the first time as part of the Territory of the former Principality of Hildesheim. In 1469, his city forged  a defensive alliance with Duke Otto of Lüneburg. He died of grief on 22/23 Jul 1471, as a result of the misfortune suffered in the war with Duke Frederick.

Sources 

House of Schauenburg
15th-century German Roman Catholic bishops
1441 births
1471 deaths